In computing, Lhasa refers to two different applications.

File archives
Lhasa is a Japanese computer program used to "unpack" or decompress compressed files in LHA, ZIP, and other formats.

Synthetic analysis
It is also the name of a computer program developed in the research group of Elias James Corey at the Harvard University Department of Chemistry which uses AI techniques to discover sequences of reactions which may be used to synthesize a compound. LHASA in this case is an acronym for Logic and Heuristics Applied to Synthetic Analysis. This program was one of the first to use a graphical interface to input and display chemical structures.

External links 
 Susie no heya  — author of Lhasa
 

Data compression software